The 2022 Belarusian Super Cup was held on 5 March 2022 between the 2021 Belarusian Premier League champions Shakhtyor Soligorsk and the 2020–21 Belarusian Cup winners BATE Borisov. BATE Borisov won the match 1–0 and won the trophy for the eighth time.

Match details

See also
2021 Belarusian Premier League
2020–21 Belarusian Cup

References

Belarusian Super Cup
Super
Belarusian Super Cup
Sports competitions in Minsk
2020s in Minsk
Belarusian Super Cup 2022
FC Shakhtyor Soligorsk matches